"Blue" is a song by the Finnish rock band The Rasmus (named just "Rasmus" back then), originally released on the band's second album Playboys on 29 August 1997.

If you exclude 1st, 2nd and 3rd and count them as EPs, "Blue" is the first single released by The Rasmus. It was released in 1997 by the record label Warner Music Finland. It was the first single from the album Playboys and features the tracks "Blue" and "Kola", both from the album Playboys.

"Blue" is a softer, more melodic song compared to the other songs from the album.

The single was a big success in the band's native country, Finland, where it sold gold and reached #3 on the Finnish Singles Chart.

Single track listing
 "Blue" – 4:19
 "Kola" – 3:24

Chart position

External links
 Lyrics

The Rasmus songs
1997 singles
Warner Music Group singles
Songs written by Lauri Ylönen
1997 songs
Songs written by Pauli Rantasalmi